Slovakia competed at the 2015 World Aquatics Championships in Kazan, Russia from 24 July to 9 August 2015.

Open water swimming

Slovakia has qualified one swimmer to compete in the open water marathon.

Swimming

Slovak swimmers have achieved qualifying standards in the following events (up to a maximum of 2 swimmers in each event at the A-standard entry time, and 1 at the B-standard):

Men

Women

Synchronized swimming

Slovakia has qualified synchronized swimmers to compete in each of the following events.

References

External links
Slovak Swimming Federation 

Nations at the 2015 World Aquatics Championships
2015 in Slovak sport
Slovakia at the World Aquatics Championships